LF Arena is a football stadium in Piteå, Sweden and the home stadium for the football team Piteå IF. LF Arena has a total capacity of 6,500 spectators.

References 

Football venues in Sweden